The men's high jump at the 1998 European Athletics Championships was held at the Népstadion on 19 and 21 August.

Medalists

Results

Qualification
Qualification: Qualification Performance 2.26 (Q) or at least 12 best performers advance to the final.

Final

References

Results
Results
Results
Video

High Jump
High jump at the European Athletics Championships